Millicent is a feminine given name. It may also refer to:

Millicent, South Australia, a town
Electoral district of Millicent, South Australia, a former Australian electoral district
Millicent, Alberta, Canada, an unincorporated community
Millicent Library, Fairhaven, Massachusetts, United States
Millicent, a micropayment system